The 2008 United States Senate election in Montana was held on November 4, 2008. Incumbent Democratic Senator Max Baucus won re-election to a sixth term in a landslide, winning more than 70% of the vote and carrying every county in the state, despite Republican John McCain's narrow victory in the state in the concurrent presidential election. As of 2022, this was the last time a Democrat was elected to the Class 2 Senate seat in Montana.

Background 
Montana generally gives its presidential electors to Republican candidates, but historically has elected several prominent Democrats to the United States Senate, including Thomas Walsh, Burton K. Wheeler, Mike Mansfield, and Lee Metcalf.  Between 1913 and 2015, only two Republicans served as U.S. Senator from Montana, Zales Ecton and Conrad Burns. In 2004, the state elected Democratic Governor Brian Schweitzer, reversing a 16-year trend of electing Republicans to the Governorship. In the 2006 elections, the Republican Party took over the state House of Representatives in Montana, the only pick-up of a state legislature for the Republicans.

Democratic primary

Candidates 
 Max Baucus, incumbent U.S. Senator

Results

Republican primary

Candidates 
 Kirk Bushman, businessman
 Bob Kelleher, attorney and perennial candidate
 Michael Lange, State Representative
 Patty Lovaas, accountant
 Anton Pearson, rancher
 Garnett Shay, engineer

Campaign 
All Republican candidates trailed Baucus badly in polls. It was revealed that Garnett Shay had an outstanding warrant for his arrest, preventing him from running an effective campaign.

Results

General election

Candidates 
 Max Baucus (D), incumbent U.S. Senator.
 Bob Kelleher (R), attorney and perennial candidate

Campaign 
Senator Baucus defeated Kelleher as a Democratic incumbent running in a year that was very successful for his party in general. The U.S. Senate race in Montana was somewhat unusual, in that it was perhaps the only race that year in which the Republican candidate was more liberal than the Democratic one. Kelleher, a perennial candidate and eccentric figure in Montana politics, took many positions that were highly unorthodox by GOP standards, such as favoring more liberal drug control policies, supporting universal healthcare and affirmative action, and favoring fair trade restrictions. He was, at the time, an 85-year-old attorney and perennial candidate who has run for office on several different party tickets. Kelleher was pro-life, advocated a Parliamentary system of government for the United States, and supported nationalization of the American oil and gas industry and a single-payer health care system. He received no support from the Montana Republican Party.

Predictions

Polling

Results

See also 
 2008 United States Senate elections
 2008 Montana gubernatorial election

References

External links 
 2008 Election Information from the Montana Secretary of State
 U.S. Congress candidates for Montana at Project Vote Smart
 Montana, U.S. Senate from CQ Politics
 Montana U.S. Senate from OurCampaigns.com
 Montana U.S. Senate race from 2008 Race Tracker
 Campaign contributions from OpenSecrets
 Kelleher (R) vs Baucus (D-i) graph of multiple polls from Pollster.com
 Election 2008 full National coverage from The Missoulian
 Official campaign websites (Archived)
 Max Baucus
 Bob Kelleher for U.S. Senate

2008
Montana
United States Senate